Carlos Ernesto Martínez (born September 21, 1991), nicknamed "Tsunami", is a Dominican professional baseball pitcher who is currently a free agent. He has played in Major League Baseball (MLB) for the St. Louis Cardinals. Originally signed by the Red Sox as an international free agent in 2009, MLB voided his contract due to discrepancies over his name and date of birth after the revelation that he was also known as Carlos Matias. However, he was eventually cleared of wrongdoing, as it was found that the inconsistencies arose from poor record keeping.

The Cardinals signed Martínez in 2010, and he became a consensus top-100 prospect within Minor League Baseball and one of the Cardinals' highest-rated prospects. A starter in the minor leagues, he made his MLB debut in 2013 and performed mainly in relief roles in his first two seasons in the major leagues, then earned a spot in the Cardinal's rotation in 2015. During his first MLB season, fans gave him the nickname "Little Pedro," due to the similarities in physique and pitching mechanics to former Cy Young Award winner Pedro Martínez.

Early life, name and visa issues
Carlos Martínez was born in Puerto Plata, Dominican Republic, in a rural zone called Colinas del Sur, where official record-keeping is sometimes poor. Following the death of his mother when he was quite young, Martínez was adopted by an uncle with the last name Matias. The young Martínez originally had plans to become a priest but changed his mind soon after starting to catch the attention of major league scouts. Raised with his uncle's last name, some confusion eventually ensued when he attempted to secure a work visa to pitch in the United States.

The team considered him comparable to first-round talent available in the Major League Baseball draft. Thus, the Red Sox moved to sign him while he was still relatively unknown, in part to get him for the lowest price possible. He signed for $140,000; however, a routine background check by Major League Baseball (MLB) officials raised several questions about the veracity of both his name and his date of birth. As a result, the Red Sox deal was voided, and, in March 2009, MLB suspended Martínez for a period of one year.

In spite of well-known endemic problems documenting the true identity of prospects from the Dominican Republic, Craig Shipley, the Red Sox executive in charge of international signing, remained adamant that the Red Sox no longer pursue Martínez. While the visa issues became more public, other teams scouted him and quietly lined up to bid for his services. The pitcher started to fulfill the projections the Red Sox had for him, such as throwing a fastball about 95 mph and a power curveball. In time, Martínez' name and date of birth discrepancies were not considered to be significant issues.

Baseball career

Minor leagues
Once the MLB suspension expired, Martínez signed with the St. Louis Cardinals as an international free agent in 2010 and received a reported $1.5 million signing bonus. While sorting out other lingering visa issues, he pitched in the Dominican Summer League (DSL), where he started 12 games and completed 59 innings pitched (IP). He topped all Cardinals minor leaguers with a 0.76 earned run average (ERA), a .144 batting average against (BAA) and 0.71 walks plus hits per inning pitched (WHIP) and ranked second with 11.9 strikeouts per nine innings pitched (K/9), third with a 5.57 strikeout-to-walk ratio (K/BB) and the fourth toughest to hit a home run against (HR/9, 0.228). He led the DSL in ERA, BAA, K/9 and WHIP (tied for first).

After impressing Cardinal team officials at a minor league mini-camp in February, 2011, he bypassed some of the lower level assignments typical to rookies and was assigned to the Quad Cities River Bandits of the Class A Midwest League in 2011. He split the season between Quad Cities and the Palm Beach Cardinals, posting a combined won–loss record (W–L) of 6–5 over 18 games and  IP. He also participated in the 2011 All-Star Futures Game.

Returning to Palm Beach to commence the 2012 season, shoulder tendonitis began to bother him after just seven starts and the Cardinals placed him on the disabled list (DL). Despite being on the DL he was advanced to Double-A ball in late May with the Springfield Cardinals of the Texas League. After returning from the shoulder problems, Martínez posted a 4–3 W–L record over 71 IP. He registered 58 SO and ended the season with a 2.90 ERA.

Work visa issues again became a problem prior to 2013 spring training. Unable to secure the proper documents due to lingering confusion as a result of his name change when originally signing with the Cardinals, Martínez sat out nearly all of the 2013 Cardinals major league spring training.

Cleared in late March, Martínez reported to Cardinals minor league spring training more than six weeks behind schedule, in time only for the last few days of camp and requiring an extended spring in Jupiter, Florida. While awaiting the visa in the Dominican Republic, Martínez built up his readiness in a throwing program. After the extended spring, he was reassigned with the Springfield Cardinals. He made just three starts there before the Cardinals called him up. Martínez sported a 2.31 ERA in  innings with nine strikeouts.

St. Louis Cardinals

Beginning career (2013–2014)
The Cardinals called up Martínez to the Major League club, the number-three prospect in their organization, on May 3, 2013. He made his major league debut against the Milwaukee Brewers at Miller Park that night. In one inning pitched, the seventh, he gave up a single, then induced a double play he started on a ground ball hit back to him, and then secured the third out with another ground ball. On May 27, the Cardinals sent Martínez down to Triple-A Memphis after seven appearances on the mound and eight innings in which he posted a 4.50 ERA with nine strikeouts. With the Redbirds in 2013, he made 13 starts. In 68 IP, he allowed a 2.51 ERA with 54 hits, three home runs (HR), 27 bases on balls (BB), while striking out 63.

The Cardinals recalled Martínez on August 8 after stretching out his innings workload with Memphis to bring his endurance back to being sufficient to handle the rigors of starting pitching. The next night, Martínez made his first major league start against the Los Angeles Dodgers, pitching five innings and giving up four earned runs. On September 20, 2013, Martínez entered a game in the tenth against the Brewers in which the Cardinals led 7–6 and closed the game in a 1–2–3 inning. His inning helped make the Cardinals victorious and gave him his first major league save. In the 2013 regular season with the Cardinals, Martínez posted a 5.08 ERA in  innings, striking out 24. He made one start, earned one save, winning two games while losing one.

The Cardinals played him in the 2013 National League Division Series (NLDS) against the Pittsburgh Pirates, where he made three total appearances, giving up two runs in two IP. Against the Dodgers in the National League Championship Series (NLCS), he appeared in four games, giving up no runs while allowing just one hit, one walk, and striking out four in  IP. In the World Series against the Red Sox, he appeared in five games, pitched six innings, giving up five hits, three runs and one walk while striking out five. The Red Sox defeated the Cardinals 4–2 in that World Series. Between the three series, he appeared in 12 games, posted a 3.55 ERA, held opponents to a .167 BAA, and allowed three walks with 11 SO in  IP.

With the fifth starting spot in the rotation open in spring training for the 2014 campaign, Martínez started the season in the bullpen of the Major League Cardinals. Injury struck the rotation in June, and he made his first two starts of the year as spot starts. He made his third major league start and won his first on June 22, pitching five innings and yielding three earned runs in a 5–3 victory over the Philadelphia Phillies. In a July 3 start against the San Francisco Giants, he reached a breakthrough as a starter. In five innings, he allowed just one run on five hits, one walk and struck out six. At the plate, he collected a two-run batted in double as the Cardinals won 7–2, and Martínez collected his second win of the season. He finished the 2014 regular season with a 4.03 ERA and 2–4 W–L in 57 games including seven starts. In December, Martínez changed his uniform number from 44 to 18 to commemorate his friend and teammate, Oscar Taveras, who had died in a car accident two weeks after the 2014 NLCS.

First season in the starting rotation (2015)
For the first time in his career in 2015, Martínez made the Cardinals starting rotation, earning the fifth starter spot out of spring training. In his first four starts of the season, his ERA was 1.89. However, in consecutive starts against the Chicago Cubs on May 4 and the Pirates on May 9, he allowed 14 runs on 16 hits and 11 walks in two starts covering nine innings. His ERA jumped to 4.73 after those two starts.

In the May 31 contest against the Dodgers, the Cardinals paid an official tribute to Taveras, who had debuted in the major leagues exactly one year earlier. The starting pitcher for the Cardinals, Martínez picked up the win, struck out eight, and extended his scoreless inning streak to  innings in a 3–1 outcome. It was the longest scoreless-inning streak in the National League (NL) for a starting pitcher through that point in the season. Martínez' next start, also against the Dodgers, came on June 5. Over seven innings, he gave up just one run on three hits and struck out 11, a new career high, in a 2–1 victory.

Nominated as a contender for the All-Star Final Vote on July 6, Martínez won the fan vote four days later, securing his first MLB All-Star selection for the game at Great American Ball Park in Cincinnati. Through that point in the season, he completed  innings and notched a 10–3 record with a 2.52 ERA. On July 25 against the Atlanta Braves, he pitched his 11th consecutive quality start, tying him with Clayton Kershaw of the Los Angeles Dodgers for longest current streak, and the longest for the Cardinals since Chris Carpenter in 2010.

The quality start streak ended on July 30 in a contest of angry exchanges with the Colorado Rockies. Martínez allowed five runs in five innings and hit DJ LeMahieu with a pitch in the fifth inning. When the inning ended, Martínez flashed an obscene gesture on full public display toward the visitors' dugout with Rockies players and personnel. Corresponding aggressive verbal exchanges ensued, including those between Cardinals catcher Yadier Molina and Rockies third baseman Nolan Arenado; no brawls started. The umpires issued warnings but no ejections followed. The Cardinals eventually won in the bottom of the ninth inning, 9–8.

Martinez' season ended early in a start against the Milwaukee Brewers on September 25 in which he threw only seven pitches. He also missed the postseason as the Cardinals had already clinched a playoff berth. The injury was a shoulder strain, but surgery was deemed unnecessary and he would recover in time for the next season. His first season in the starting rotation included 14–7 record, a 3.01 ERA and  IP. He finished in the top ten in the NL in ERA, won-lost percentage, SO/9, wins, home runs per nine innings allowed, and wild pitches. His 9.2 SO/9 was the third-highest single-season average in franchise history.

2016 season
Martinez was granted permission to leave the team April 30, 2016, to resolve a civil suit filed against him in Miami, Florida. The Cardinals conducted an investigation regarding the allegations in the case, which suspected to be domestic violence. MLB did not contact the Cardinals at the time, but had recently updated their personal conduct policy, especially if any player had committed such an offensive of domestic violence.

Martinez started 31 games in the 2016 season, ending with a 16–9 record, a 3.04 ERA, and 195.1 innings pitched.

2017 season
On February 2, 2017, it was announced that Martínez had signed a five-year extension with the St. Louis Cardinals worth 51 million dollars. On April 2, 2017, Martinez pitched his first Opening Night start of his career, playing the defending World Series champion Chicago Cubs at Busch Stadium. He struck out 10 and allowed no walks and six hits over  innings. He received a no-decision as Randal Grichuk hit a walk-off bases-loaded single in the bottom of the ninth. At Yankee Stadium on April 15, Martínez struck out 11 batters, and walked eight, becoming the first to record both those marks in the same game since Randy Johnson in 1993. Martínez completed  innings in a 3−2 loss to New York. On June 10, Martinez pitched both his first career complete game and shutout while allowing four hits as the Cardinals defeated the Philadelphia Phillies 7–0.

For the second time in his career, Martínez became an All-Star selection, as resulted in a vote by fellow players. Through that point in the season, Martínez' 2.88 ERA ranked seventh in the NL, and his 10.2 K/9 was his career best.

Martínez pitched in 32 games (all starts) in 2017, compiling a 12–11 record, 3.64 ERA, and a 1.22 WHIP. He led all MLB pitchers in errors, with four.

2018 season
The Cardinals selected Martínez to start 2018 Opening Day, making it his second consecutive year doing so. It occurred versus the New York Mets on March 29, where he walked six and hit one batter, ending with a 9–4 defeat. He hit his first career home run on May 2, which was versus the Chicago White Sox. On the mound, he allowed five hits and one earned run over  innings to drop his ERA to 1.40 through that point in the season. Martinez finished the game pitching 7.1 innings as the Cardinals won a close game 3–2. On May 10, Martinez was placed on the 10-day disabled list due to a right lat strain. On July 21, Martinez was again placed on the 10-day disabled list due to a right oblique strain. He was activated on August 21 and moved to the bullpen. He finished 2018 with an 8–6 record and a 3.11 ERA in 33 games (18 starts) with five saves.

2019–2021 seasons
Martínez began the 2019 season on the 10-day injured list due to a strained rotator cuff. When he returned, he returned as a reliever, eventually taking over closing duties. Over 48 relief appearances during the regular season, he earned 24 saves in 27 opportunities with a 3.17 ERA, striking out 53 over  innings.

After the 2020 season, Martínez played for Águilas Cibaeñas of the Dominican Professional Baseball League (LIDOM). He has also played for Dominican Republic in the 2021 Caribbean Series.

During the 2020 season, a year that was shortened due to an ongoing COVID-19 crisis, Martinez had an 0–3 record and a 9.90 ERA in 5 starts.

On June 2, 2021, Martínez had one of the worst outings in his professional career as he allowed 10 runs against the Los Angeles Dodgers in the first inning and was taken out of the game after recording just two outs. On July 9, he was placed on the 60-day injured list with a torn thumb ligament. On July 19, Martínez underwent surgery to repair the ligament tear in his right thumb and missed the remainder of the season.

After the season, the Cardinals declined Martínez's option for the 2022 season, making him a free agent for the first time in his career.

2022 season
Prior to the 2022 season, Martínez initially signed a minor-league contract with the San Francisco Giants on March 19, but was released on April 28. He then signed a minor-league contract with the Boston Red Sox on May 7. In his Worcester debut on May 8, starting against the Toledo Mud Hens, he lasted  of an inning while giving up five runs on four hits and two walks. He was released on May 18.

On May 27, 2022, Martínez was suspended by Major League Baseball for 80 games after testing positive for ibutamoren.

On September 1, 2022, Martínez was suspended again by MLB for 85 games after violating the Major League Baseball Joint Domestic Violence, Sexual Assault and Child Abuse Policy, retroactive to June 19. Per the terms of the policy, Martínez will participate in a confidential evaluation and treatment program supervised by the Joint Policy Board.

Awards

Pitching profile
Standing  and weighing , Carlos Martínez has been commonly compared to former Cy Young winner and Hall of Famer Pedro Martínez, due to being right-handed, having a similar physique, and deceptive and surprisingly fluid pitching mechanics. Further, they both are considered power pitchers with undersized builds featuring explosive and electric pitching repertoires. For this, Carlos Martínez has been nicknamed "Baby Pedro." In spite of his stereotypic physical limitations, certain attributes such as his natural athleticism cover somewhat for the lack of height. Further, a loose frame and naturally quick release also play up his skills on the mound. Martínez started his professional career throwing three pitches, a fastball, curveball, and a changeup. He has since added a sinking fastball and slider.

The high-velocity, electric fastball that originally caught the attention of Red Sox scouts when Martínez was 17 has developed into an elite-level pitch beyond initial expectations. His fastball has drawn further comparisons with Pedro Martínez.

Martínez maintains fastball fleetness both from the windup and from the stretch. Because his arm speed generates immense recoil, he finishes off-balance, leaving him in an awkward position to field certain batted balls. His fastball is graded at 70 on a standard 20–80 scale, with a volatile life that vaults itself on batters, making it difficult for them to square their bats, and thus, hit effectively. His small stature and long recoil somewhat limit the command, but that is mitigated with the natural explosiveness and movement of the pitch. The sinking version of his fastball can get up to 96 MPH, while averaging .

The curveball Martínez throws is one of his breaking balls, grading at a 50 on the 20–80 scale, and 60 potential on a 20–80 scale as of October 2012. It features either an 11-to-5 or 12-to-6 break and it is very difficult to hit when in top form. The main discrepancy with this pitch is when he gets around on it and finishes with a "looping" effect. His other breaking pitch, the slider, became a fastball alternative go-to pitch in 2013.

The changeup was Martínez' secondary pitch throughout his rise in minor leagues. It averages in the mid- to upper-80s MPH and shows some sink at times, and grades at 40 on a 20–80 scale with 50 potential, as of October 2012. However, he also lacked feel and can throw it too firmly. It is especially effective, however, because of his ability to throw it with nearly identical arm speed to his fastball. With the efficaciousness of the fastball and curveball, the changeup is not required in a relief role, but gives a versatile option when starting. Overall, throwing strikes needs to improve, especially down in the strike zone, according to Baseball Prospect Nation. Nonetheless, this could develop into a plus skill. He naturally operates high in the strike zone, so working down will shift the hitters' eye levels in addition to the confounding movement of the fastball and curveball.

Whether there have been any concerns about effectiveness related to Martínez' lack of physical stature, his career minor league numbers have minimized them through 2013. In  IP, he has allowed just 14 HR for a rate of 0.4 HR/9. He allowed one home run in  IP with the major league club in 2013. His ground-ball rate was above 50 percent in 2012–13, after steadily increasing as he progressed through the minor leagues. It was 52.3% for the Cardinals in 2013. His fly-ball rate has held steady throughout his professional career.

Personal life
Martínez and his wife, Laura Rivas, have three sons.

Philanthropy
In 2015, Martínez founded the Tsunami Waves Foundation to help children in need in Missouri, Illinois, and in the Dominican Republic. He has visited schools and set up baseball clinics in Fairmont City, Illinois and collected gloves and other baseball equipment for kids in Puerto Plata. He hosts an annual charity bowling event to raise money for the Foundation.

See also

 List of Major League Baseball players from the Dominican Republic
 St. Louis Cardinals all-time roster

References

External links

 

1991 births
Living people
People from Puerto Plata, Dominican Republic
Dominican Republic expatriate baseball players in the United States
Dominican Republic sportspeople in doping cases
Major League Baseball players from the Dominican Republic
Major League Baseball pitchers
St. Louis Cardinals players
Águilas Cibaeñas players
Dominican Summer League Cardinals players
Memphis Redbirds players
National League All-Stars
Palm Beach Cardinals players
Quad Cities River Bandits players
Springfield Cardinals players
Worcester Red Sox players
World Baseball Classic players of the Dominican Republic
2017 World Baseball Classic players